Mary Temple may refer to:
the pen name of Daisy Rossi
Mary Temple Grandin, American scientist
Mary Boyce Temple, American philanthropist
Mary Temple (politician), councillor in Toronto; wife of William Horace Temple